Altfrid Heger is a German racing driver who competed in the 1987 World Touring Car Championship. He won the 1988 Guia Race.  Heger is the co-founder of Hegersport, a German company which organizes auto racing series such as the V8Star Series.

Racing record

Complete 24 Hours of Le Mans results

Complete International Formula 3000 results
(key) (Races in bold indicate pole position; races in italics indicate fastest lap.)

Complete Deutsche Tourenwagen Meisterschaft results
(key) (Races in bold indicate pole position) (Races in italics indicate fastest lap)

Complete Super Tourenwagen Cup results
(key) (Races in bold indicate pole position) (Races in italics indicate fastest lap)

FIA GT competition results

Complete FIA GT Championship results
(key) (Races in bold indicate pole position) (Races in italics indicate fastest lap)

Complete GT1 World Championship results
(key) (Races in bold indicate pole position; races in italics indicate fastest lap.)

External links
Driver DB Profile

German racing drivers
International Formula 3000 drivers
24 Hours of Le Mans drivers
World Touring Car Championship drivers
Living people
FIA GT1 World Championship drivers
Porsche Supercup drivers
World Sportscar Championship drivers
ADAC GT Masters drivers
24 Hours of Spa drivers
European Touring Car Championship drivers
1958 births
Deutsche Tourenwagen Masters drivers
24H Series drivers
Sportspeople from Essen
Peugeot Sport drivers
BMW M drivers
Schnitzer Motorsport drivers
Nürburgring 24 Hours drivers
Volkswagen Motorsport drivers